The 2018–19 South Carolina Gamecocks women's basketball team represents the University of South Carolina during the 2018–19 NCAA Division I women's basketball season. The Gamecocks, led by eleventh year head coach Dawn Staley, play their home games at the Colonial Life Arena and were members of the Southeastern Conference. They finished the season 23–10, 13–3 in SEC play to finish in second place. They lost in the quarterfinals of the SEC women's tournament to Arkansas. They received an at-large bid to the NCAA women's tournament where they defeated Belmont and Florida State in the first and second rounds before losing to Baylor in the Sweet Sixteen.

Previous season
The Gamecocks finished the 2017–18 season 29–7, 12–4 in SEC play to finish in a tie for second place. They defeated Tennessee, Georgia and Mississippi State to win the SEC women's tournament to earn an automatic bid to the NCAA women's tournament. They defeated North Carolina A&T and Virginia in the first and second rounds, Buffalo in the sweet sixteen before losing to Connecticut in the elite eight.

Offseason

Departures

Recruits

Roster

Schedule

|-
!colspan=12 style=| Exhibition

|-
!colspan=12 style=| Regular season

|-
!colspan=9 style=|SEC Women's Tournament

|-
!colspan=9 style=|NCAA Women's Tournament

†Colonial Life Arena was being used for the First and Second Rounds of the 2019 NCAA Division I men's basketball tournament, so South Carolina hosted their games at Dale F. Halton Arena in Charlotte, North Carolina.

Rankings

^Coaches' Poll did not release a second poll at the same time as the AP.

References

South Carolina Gamecocks women's basketball seasons
South Carolina
Gamecocks
South Carolina